The marsh widowbird or Hartlaub's widowbird (Euplectes hartlaubi) is a bird in the family Ploceidae. The species was first described by José Vicente Barbosa du Bocage in 1878.

Range
It is found in Angola, Cameroon, the Republic of the Congo, the Democratic Republic of the Congo, Gabon, Kenya, Nigeria, Tanzania, Uganda, and Zambia.

References

marsh widowbird
Birds of Central Africa
marsh widowbird
Taxonomy articles created by Polbot